This is a list of Volga Bulgaria baltawars, iltäbärs and emirs (kings).

 Kotrag, 665–700, founder of Volga Bulgaria
 Irkhan, 700–765
 Tuqyi, 765–815
 Aidar, 815–865
 Shilki, 865–882
 Batyr Mö'min, 882–895
 Almış, 895–925, first Muslim ruler
 Mikail bine Cäğfär, 925–943
 Äxmäd bine Cäğfär, 943–950
 Abdulla bine Mikail, 950–970
 Talib bine Äxmäd, 970–976
 Mö'min bine Äxmäd 976–980
 Abd ar-Rahman bine Mö'min, 980–1006
 Abu Ishak Ibrahim bine Mohammad, 1006–1026
 ...
 Näzir äd-Din, ~1200–1225
 Mustansir, 1225–1242
 ...
 Altynbek, ~1400
 Galimbek ~1430

Volga Bulgaria
Volga Bulgaria kings
Volga Bulgaria kings